Mount Christie is a  mountain summit located in the Athabasca River valley of Jasper National Park, in the Canadian Rockies of Alberta, Canada. The nearest higher peak is Brussels Peak,  to the south-southwest. Mount Christie can be seen from the Icefields Parkway.

History

The mountain was named by James Hector in 1859 for William J. Christie, a Canadian explorer and politician. Christie was the Chief factor at the Hudson's Bay Company in Fort Edmonton when Hector and the Palliser expedition wintered there in 1858–1859. The first ascent of the mountain was made in 1930 by W.R. Hainsworth, J.F. Lehmann, M.M. Strumia, and N.D. Waffl. The mountain's name was officially adopted as Mount Christie in 1947 by the Geographical Names Board of Canada.

Geology

Mount Christie is composed of sedimentary rock laid down from the Precambrian to Jurassic periods. Formed in shallow seas, this sedimentary rock was pushed east and over the top of younger rock during the Laramide orogeny.

Climate

Based on the Köppen climate classification, Mount Christie is located in a subarctic climate zone with cold, snowy winters, and mild summers. Winter temperatures can drop below -20 °C with wind chill factors below -30 °C. Precipitation runoff from Mount Christie drains into the Athabasca River.

See also
List of mountains of Canada
Geology of the Rocky Mountains

References

External links
 Parks Canada web site: Jasper National Park

Christie
Christie
Christie